Nicolas Riopel (born February 20, 1989) is a Canadian former professional ice hockey goaltender who played in the American Hockey League (AHL).

Playing career
Riopel began his major junior career with the Moncton Wildcats in 2005–06, appearing in 5 games. He shared starts with the older Jhase Sniderman in his rookie season in 2006–07 before taking the starting position in 2007–08. In his third season with the Wildcats, Riopel emerged with a record-setting and award-winning campaign. Along with his 43 wins, which helped Moncton to an Atlantic Division title, and .930 save percentage, he established a league record with a 2.01 goals against average, far surpassing Martin Houle of the Cape Breton Screaming Eagles previous record of 2.32, set in 2003–04. Riopel was awarded the Jacques Plante Memorial Trophy for having the lowest GAA in the league and the Michel Brière Memorial Trophy as player of the year. Selected in the 5th round, 142nd overall, of the 2009 NHL Entry Draft by the Philadelphia Flyers.

Riopel began the 2009–2010 season by claiming a spot in training camp with the Flyers' top AHL affiliate, the Adirondack Phantoms. After posting a 4-6-0 record with a 3.35 GAA and a 0.893 save percentage in back-up duty to Johan Backlund, Riopel was loaned back to his Junior club, the Moncton Wildcats, on December 17, 2009.

After attending both the Philadelphia Flyers' training camp and then the Adirondack Phantoms' training camp, Riopel was assigned to the Greenville Road Warriors of the ECHL. However, after performing extremely well in "AA" hockey, he was recalled after Greg Gilbert was released as head coach of the Phantoms to replace Brian Stewart. Since, he has become the starting netminder for the Glens Falls team after an injury to starter Johan Backlund.

After Flyers Stanley Cup goaltender Michael Leighton was waived and sent to the Adirondack Phantoms on January 4, 2011, the logjam at the position saw Riopel returned to Greenville.

Since Riopel wasn't signed to an entry-level contract by June 1, 2011, the Flyers no longer hold his NHL rights.  He signed a contract with the ECHL's Greenville Road Warriors in the summer of 2011.

On August 9, 2012, Riopel inked a deal with the Dundee Stars of the EIHL in Scotland. Riopel played two further seasons abroad with Frederikshavn White Hawks in Denmark and in the French Ligue Magnus with the Dragons de Rouen.

On September 16, 2015, Riopel returned to North America in signing a one-year ECHL contract with the Rapid City Rush. He was winless in two games to start the 2015–16 season before he was released by the Rush. On November 6, 2015, he remained in the league after he was signed by the Norfolk Admirals. Riopel appeared in 32 games with the Admirals, and after a string of impressive performances was signed by the Syracuse Crunch to end the year on March 4, 2016.

Although failing to feature in a game with the Crunch, in the off-season on August 22, 2016, Riopel was signed to a one-year deal to remain in the AHL with the Syracuse Crunch.

In the 2017–18 season, on January 20, 2018, Riopel appeared in his first AHL game in seven seasons. He replaced Connor Ingram at the start of third period against the Utica Comets. He faced 2 shots, turning aside both in a 4-2 loss to the Comets. On February 1, 2018, he was traded by the Crunch along with Ty Loney to the Bakersfield Condors in exchange for NHL contracted goaltender Eddie Pasquale. He was assigned to the Condors ECHL affiliate, the Wichita Thunder.

On July 29, 2018, Riopel announced his retirement after playing in nine professional seasons.

Career statistics

Regular season and playoffs

Awards and honours

Records
QMJHL league record; lowest goals against average, single-season - 2.01 in 2008–09

References

External links
 

1989 births
Adirondack Phantoms players
Adirondack Thunder players
Canadian ice hockey goaltenders
Canadian people of Italian descent
Dragons de Rouen players
Dundee Stars players
Frederikshavn White Hawks players
Greenville Road Warriors players
Ice hockey people from Quebec
Kalamazoo Wings (ECHL) players
Living people
Moncton Wildcats players
Norfolk Admirals (ECHL) players
Philadelphia Flyers draft picks
Rapid City Rush players
Syracuse Crunch players
Wichita Thunder players
Canadian expatriate ice hockey players in the United States
Canadian expatriate ice hockey players in Scotland
Canadian expatriate ice hockey players in Denmark
Canadian expatriate ice hockey players in France